The 2014 Teen Choice Awards ceremony was held on August 10, 2014 at the Shrine Auditorium in Los Angeles, California. The event was originally scheduled to take place at the UCLA Pauley Pavilion, which was flooded by a broken water pipe on July 29, 2014 near the campus. It was broadcast on Fox at 8:00–10:00 pm ET live/PT tape-delayed. The awards celebrate the year's achievements in music, film, television, sports, fashion, comedy, and the Internet, and were voted on by viewers aged 13 through 19.
Selena Gomez was awarded the Ultimate Choice Award during the show.

One Direction were the biggest winners of the night, winning all ten awards they were nominated for (including an award given out to Harry Styles and one dedicated to their fans). The Fault in Our Stars won all seven of its nominations as well, including four awards for Ansel Elgort.

Voting controversy
Tweets from nominees of the newly added Internet categories stirred up questions amongst viewers as Choice Viner Cameron Dallas tweeted to his three million followers that he was informed of winning his Teen Choice Award 6 days before voting ended. Matt Espinosa, another nominee of the night also voiced his opinion as he tweeted, "Basically they picked the people almost 6 days before voting was done and used all of us for promotion." The two viners both deleted their tweets shortly after.  However, teens continued to show their outrage. Tweets concerning the voting process flooded Twitter as many upset voters express their opinion of the fixed results.  Nevertheless, the TCA rules state that, "Teenasaurus Rox reserves the right to choose the winner from the top four vote generators." Speculation of the significance of the teens' votes continue as it is uncertain of who actually had the most votes in each category.

Presenters
 Taylor Swift — presented Choice Movie Actor: Drama
 Collins Key — introduced Keegan Allen, Tyler Blackburn and Ian Harding
 Keegan Allen, Tyler Blackburn and Ian Harding — presented Choice TV Show: Reality
 Jamie Blackley and Chloë Grace Moretz — presented Choice Movie Actor: Sci-Fi/Fantasy
 Victoria Justice and Gregg Sulkin — introduced Magic!
 Nina Dobrev and Kellan Lutz — presented Choice Movie Actress: Action
 Cameron Dallas and Bella Thorne — presented Candie's Choice Style Icon
 The Band Perry — presented Choice TV Actress: Drama
 Jennifer Lopez — presented Choice Movie: Drama
 Odeya Rush and Brenton Thwaites — introduced Rixton
 Colton Haynes and Fifth Harmony — presented Choice Web Stars: Male and Female
 Ciara Bravo, Cat Deely, Charlie Rowe and Nolan Sotillo — introduced Becky G
 MKTO and Cody Simpson — presented Olay Fresh Effects Breakout Star
 Lea Michele and Paul Wesley — presented Choice Movie: Villain
 Hailee Steinfeld and Nat Wolff — presented Choice Movie Actor: Comedy
 Ian Somerhalder — presented Choice Music: Female Artist
 Jake T. Austin and Hilary Duff — introduced Jason Derulo

Performers
 Demi Lovato featuring Cher Lloyd — "Really Don't Care"
 Magic! — "Rude"
 Rixton — "Wait on Me" and "Me and My Broken Heart"
 Becky G — "Shower"
 Jason Derulo — "Wiggle" and "Talk Dirty"

Winners and nominees
The first wave of nominees was announced on June 17, 2014. The second wave of nominees was announced on July 17, 2014. There are a total of 88 awards.

Winners are listed first and highlighted in bold text.

Movies

Television

Music

Fashion

Sports

Miscellaneous

Web

References

External links
 Official TCA Website
 2014 TEEN CHOICE AWARDS WINNERS LIST

2014
2014 awards in the United States
2014 in American music
2014 in Los Angeles